Jonathan Richard Maden (born 21 September 1972) is a male English former competitive swimmer who specialised in breaststroke events.

Swimming career
He represented Great Britain in the Olympics, FINA world championships and European championships, and England in the Commonwealth Games.  At the 1996 Summer Olympics in Atlanta, Georgia, he finished ninth in the men's 100-metre breaststroke in a time of 1:02.51.

He represented England and won a silver medal in the 4 x 100 metres medley relay event, at the 1998 Commonwealth Games in Kuala Lumpur, Malaysia.

In 1997 at the ASA National British Championships he won all three National breaststroke titles over 50 metres breaststroke, 100 metres breaststroke and the 200 metres breaststroke.

Affiliated with swimming club Rochdale Aquabears, Maden won the bronze medal in the men's 4×100-metre medley relay at the 1997 FINA Short Course World Championships, alongside Martin Harris (backstroke), James Hickman (butterfly) and Mark Foster (freestyle).

See also
 List of Commonwealth Games medallists in swimming (men)

References

1972 births
Living people
Male breaststroke swimmers
English male swimmers
Olympic swimmers of Great Britain
Swimmers at the 1996 Summer Olympics
People from Littleborough, Greater Manchester
Medalists at the FINA World Swimming Championships (25 m)
Commonwealth Games medallists in swimming
Commonwealth Games silver medallists for England
Swimmers at the 1998 Commonwealth Games
Medallists at the 1998 Commonwealth Games